Mareth is a town and commune in Tunisia, located between Gabès and Medenine. In 2014 it had a population of 17,385.

References

Populated places in Gabès Governorate
Communes of Tunisia